Christiane Hofmann (born 12 December 1968) is a German former professional tennis player.

Born in Munich, Hofmann reached a best singles ranking of 170 in the world on the professional tour, winning two ITF titles. She played in the qualifying draws of the French Open, at Wimbledon and the US Open.

Hofmann never made it past the first round of a WTA Tour singles tournament, but was a doubles semifinalist at Palermo in 1990, partnering Venezuelan's María Vento.

ITF finals

Singles: 4 (2–2)

Doubles: 1 (0–1)

References

External links
 
 

1968 births
Living people
West German female tennis players
German female tennis players
Tennis players from Munich